Arnott is an unincorporated community located in the town of Stockton, Portage County, Wisconsin, United States. It is situated at the intersection of County Hwys. B and J.

History

In 1872, the Green Bay and Western Railroad laid tracks through a portion of what is now Arnott. During 1881 and 1882, William Arnott, Joseph Bremmer, and Calvin Richmond canvassed the countryside raising money to build a railroad depot. The depot, and the settlement around it, was named after Arnott, a local farmer who served as chairman of the town of Stockton and the Portage County Board, and who was elected to the Wisconsin Legislature in 1876.

Geography
Arnott is located in central Wisconsin approximately four miles east of Plover, four miles south-south west of Custer, and seven miles west of Amherst (Lat: 44° 27' 26.0", Lon: -89° 26'  48.5").

Economy
Arnott has one tavern, a feed mill, a lawn equipment dealer, and an egg roll factory. It is a stopover for the Tomorrow River Trail, a former railroad grade turned into walking path, and snowmobile trail.

Arnott is near the Wimme Sand & Gravel Pit, Milestone Materials' gravel pit, American Asphalt's Custer Road plant, and a traffic safety/road marking company.

Notable people
 Charles Page, philanthropist

References

External links

Unincorporated communities in Wisconsin
Unincorporated communities in Portage County, Wisconsin